The 2016–17 season was the 102nd season of the Isthmian League, which is an English football competition featuring semi-professional and amateur clubs from London, East and South East England. Also, it was the eleventh season for the current incarnations of Division One North and Division One South. The league constitution was announced on 12 May 2016 and concluded on 1 May 2017.

Premier Division

Farnborough were required by the Isthmian League to pay their creditors in full before the league's 2016 AGM. As this was not fulfilled, the league relegated the club from the Premier Division to Step 4, and Burgess Hill Town were reprieved from relegation.

The Premier Division consisted of 24 clubs: 18 clubs from the previous season, and six new clubs:
AFC Sudbury, promoted as champions of Division One North
Folkestone Invicta, promoted as champions of Division One South
Harlow Town, play-off winners in Division One North
Havant & Waterlooville, relegated from National League South
Lowestoft Town, relegated from National League North
Worthing, play-off winners in Division One South

Havant & Waterlooville were pronounced champions of the Premier Division on 22 April 2017, and returned to the National League at the first attempt along with play-off winners Bognor Regis Town, who spent eight years in the Isthmian League after relegation from Conference South in 2009. AFC Sudbury, who reached Premier Division for the first time in their history relegated back to Division One North along with Canvey Island and Grays Athletic. Harrow Borough were reprieved from relegation after Worcester City, who relegated from National League North took a further voluntary demotion to the Midland League for financial reasons.

League table

Top scorers

Play-offs

Semi-finals

Final

Results

Stadia and locations

Division One North

Division One North consisted of 24 clubs: 19 clubs from the previous season, and five new clubs:
Bowers & Pitsea, promoted from the Essex Senior League
Brentwood Town, relegated from the Premier Division
Norwich United, promoted from the Eastern Counties League
VCD Athletic, relegated from the Premier Division
Ware, transferred from Southern League Division One Central

Brightlingsea Regent were pronounced champions of Division One North on 8 April 2017, and promoted with play-off Thurrock. Wroxham, who were reprieved from relegation twice in three previous seasons were finally relegated along with Great Wakering Rovers. Ware get a reprieve after Worcester City took a voluntary demotion from National League to Midland League.

League table

Top scorers

Play-offs

Semi-finals

Final

Results

Stadia and locations

Division One South

Division One South consisted of 24 clubs: 19 clubs from the previous season, and five new clubs:
Cray Wanderers, transferred from Division One North
Godalming Town, transferred from Southern Football League Division One Central
Greenwich Borough, promoted from Southern Counties East League
Horsham, promoted from the Southern Combination League
Lewes, relegated from the Premier Division

Tooting & Mitcham United were pronounced champions of Division One South on 22 April 2017, and returned to the Premier Division after five seasons in Division One South along with play-off winners Dorking Wanderers who reached this level for the first time in their history.

League table

Top scorers

Play-offs

Semi-finals

Final

Results

Stadia and locations

League Cup

The 2016–17 Alan Turvey Trophy sponsored by Robert Dyas (formerly the Isthmian League Cup) is the 43rd season of the Alan Turvey Trophy, the cup competition of the whole Isthmian League.

Calendar

The Isthmian League Cup was voluntary this season, ten clubs decided not to take part in the competition:

Bognor Regis Town
Cray Wanderers
Dereham Town
Havant & Waterlooville
Guernsey

Lewes
Norwich United
Phoenix Sports
Thurrock
Wroxham

First round
Sixty clubs participated in the First round, while two clubs received a bye to the Second round:
Bury Town
Dorking Wanderers

Second round
Thirty clubs to have made it through the First round were entered into the draw with two clubs who get a bye, making thirty-two teams.

Third round

Quarterfinals

Semifinals

Final

See also
Isthmian League
2016–17 Northern Premier League
2016–17 Southern Football League

References

External links
Official website

2016-17
7